Presidential elections were held in Equatorial Guinea on 25 June 1989, the first since 1968, although incumbent Teodoro Obiang Nguema Mbasogo had his seven-year term starting in 1982 approved in a referendum in 1982. He was the only candidate and was re-elected unopposed with 99% of the vote.

References

Equatorial Guinea
1989 in Equatorial Guinea
One-party elections
Presidential elections in Equatorial Guinea
Single-candidate elections
June 1989 events in Africa
Election and referendum articles with incomplete results